Robert Lee Pollard (December 30, 1948 in Beaumont, Texas) is an American football former defensive lineman who played 11 seasons in the National Football League for the New Orleans Saints and the St. Louis Cardinals.

Pollard attended the black Hebert High School in Beaumont and began his college football career in 1966 at Texas Southern University in Houston, as he wanted to stay close to his family. Texas Southern University is considered an Historically Black College and University. After a year and a half, he decided to transfer to Weber State University even though he had been a starter at Texas Southern because he felt that the school was trying to take his scholarship away in order to offer it to talented out of state players.

Bob was named Saints defensive captain from 1976 to 1977 and was inducted into the New Orleans Saints Hall of Fame in 1995. In 1977, the Saints traded Pollard and guard Terry Stieve, to the St. Louis Cardinals for Pro Bowl guard Conrad Dobler and wide receiver Ike Harris. He finished his career with St. Louis in 1981. Although quarterback sacks were not officially recorded prior to 1982, he has been credited with 57.0 sacks during his career.

In 1971, Bob Pollard was one of sixteen pro football players from Beaumont to be given the Keys to The City.

References

1948 births
Living people
People from Beaumont, Texas
American football defensive linemen
Weber State Wildcats football players
New Orleans Saints players
St. Louis Cardinals (football) players